County Galway was a United Kingdom parliamentary constituency in Ireland, comprised the whole of County Galway, except for the Borough of Galway. It replaced the pre-Act of Union Parliament of Ireland constituency. Its representatives sat in the British House of Commons.

It returned two Members of Parliament.

The constituency was abolished in 1885 and replaced by smaller constituencies in the county.

Members of Parliament
Constituency created (1801)

As a result of the Redistribution of Seats Act 1885, the constituency was abolished at the 1885 general election and replaced by 4 single-member constituencies:
 Galway Connemara
 Galway East
 Galway North
 Galway South

Notes

Elections

Elections in the 1830s

Elections in the 1840s

 

Martin's death caused a by-election.

Elections in the 1850s

Elections in the 1860s

 

de Burgh's death caused a by-election.

Elections in the 1870s
de Burgh-Canning resigned, causing a by-election.

Gregory was appointed Governor of Ceylon, causing a by-election.

 

 On 13 June 1872, on petition, Nolan was unseated due to "undue influence exerted by the Roman Catholic clergy", and Trench was declared elected.

Elections in the 1880s

References

The Parliaments of England by Henry Stooks Smith (1st edition published in three volumes 1844–50), 2nd edition edited (in one volume) by F.W.S. Craig (Political Reference Publications 1973)

Westminster constituencies in County Galway (historic)
Constituencies of the Parliament of the United Kingdom established in 1801
Constituencies of the Parliament of the United Kingdom disestablished in 1885
1801 establishments in Ireland
1885 disestablishments in Ireland